Crimes in Mind is a 1985 album by Streets.

Track listing

Personnel
Steve Walsh - synthesizer, keyboard, lead vocals
Tim Gehrt - percussion, drums, vocals
Billy Greer - bass, vocals
Mike Slamer - guitar

Notes

Mike Slamer re-cut "The Nightmare Begins" with his band Steelhouse Lane for their 1999 second album Slaves of the New World.

Charts

References

External links
http://www.cduniverse.com/productinfo.asp?pid=5311902&style=music

Streets (band) albums
1985 albums
Albums produced by Beau Hill
Atlantic Records albums